Atlixtac is one of the 81 municipalities of Guerrero, in south-western Mexico. The municipal seat lies at Atlixtac.  The municipality covers an area of 694 km².

In 2005, the municipality had a total population of 23,371.

References

Municipalities of Guerrero